The siege of Coron in 1532–1534 involved the siege and capture of the Ottoman-held fortress of Koroni (Coron) in Messenia, Greece, by the forces of the Habsburg Empire, and its subsequent recapture by the Ottomans.

Coron had been a possession of Venice since 1209, but Sultan Bayezid II captured it in 1500. In 1532, the Habsburg emperor Charles V ordered the Genoese admiral Andrea Doria to attack it as a diversion to the campaigns of the Little War in Hungary. Doria managed to capture the city, and to lay waste to the surrounding coast.

In spring 1533, the Ottoman Emperor Suleiman the Magnificent sent 60 galleys to retake the city. They blockaded the harbour, but they were defeated by Admiral Doria of the Genoese navy, highlighting the weakness of the Ottoman Navy at that time. An Ottoman land army however was successful in laying a siege around the city, forcing its surrender on 1 April 1534. The weakened Spanish garrison was allowed to leave the city unharmed.

Notes

References
 Roger Crowley (2008), Empires of the sea, Faber & Faber  
 

Coron
Coron
Coron
Coron 1533
Coron
Ottoman Peloponnese
16th century in Greece
Coron
1532 in the Ottoman Empire
1530s in Europe
History of Messenia